Captain Henry Hugh Gordon Dacre Stoker,  (2 February 1885 – 2 February 1966), also known as Hew Stoker and commonly credited in films as H. G. Stoker  or Dacre Stoker, was an Irish Royal Navy officer who commanded the Royal Australian Navy's submarine  during the First World War. Stoker was captured in 1915 and he spent the remaining three-and-a-half years as a prisoner of war of the Ottoman Empire. He retired from the navy in 1920 to pursue an acting career on the stage and film. As an amateur athlete, Stoker competed in the Wimbledon tennis championships throughout the 1920s. With the outbreak of the Second World War, he was recalled to service in the navy, where he helped with public relations. When the war finished, Stoker returned to his acting career. In 1962, at the age of 77, he became Irish Croquet Champion.

Early life
Henry Hugh Gordon Dacre Stoker was born in Dublin, Ireland, on 2 February 1885, the fourth of six children and second son of Dr William Stoker and Jane Martin Ross Stoker . William's brother was Dr Francis Owen Stoker, a two-time winner of the Wimbledon Championships Gentlemen's Doubles and an Irish international rugby union player. They were cousins of the author Bram Stoker.

Henry was educated in Dublin; he was an average student but excelled at sport, particularly tennis and rugby.

Naval career
Stoker joined the Royal Navy on 15 January 1900 as a cadet on the training ship  at Dartmouth Harbour.

Stoker was promoted to lieutenant on 31 December 1906; he completed his submariner training in October 1907 and was given command of the submarine  in January 1909.

Australian service
In 1913, after hearing rumours of a man in Sydney sponsoring men to play polo, Stoker volunteered to be loaned to the Royal Australian Navy (RAN). AE2 was accompanied by its sister submarine , with crews composed of both RN and RAN personnel, and sailed from England for Australia on 2 March 1914.

First World War
Following the outbreak of the First World War in August 1914, AE1 and AE2 joined the Australian Naval and Military Expeditionary Force (ANMEF) to capture the German colony New Guinea. The German territories surrendering on 22 September; AE2 patrolled the sea around Fiji and returned to Sydney for maintenance on 16 November.

AE2 departed Sydney on 19 December to meet up with the second convoy of Australian Imperial Force (AIF) in Albany, Western Australia. She joined the convoy to Suez, completing most of it under tow. Stoker was promoted to lieutenant commander on 31 December 1914. On 28 January 1915, AE2 arrived at Suez, where it joined the Mediterranean Fleet, which operated in support of the Dardanelles campaign. To Vice-Admiral John de Robeck, Stoker presented plans for his submarine to force a passage through the heavily defended Dardanelles Strait, and enter the Sea of Marmara and disrupt shipping, which would make supply and reinforcement of the enemy more difficult. 

On 25 April 1915, Stoker took AE2 through the  strait and entered the Sea of Marmara, the first allied submarine to do so. Other submarines soon followed.

Stoker spent the rest of the war a prisoner of war (POW) in the Ottoman Empire. He made three unsuccessful escape attempts, but spent the majority of his time entertaining other POWs. He was repatriated to England in December 1918 and reverted back to Royal Navy service on 9 February 1919. He was awarded the Distinguished Service Order (DSO) on 22 April 1919 "In recognition of his gallantry in making the passage of the Dardanelles in command of HM Australian Submarine AE2 on 25 April 1915". On 17 October 1919 he was mentioned in despatches "For valuable services in HM Australian Submarine AE2 in the prosecution of the war".

He was promoted to commander on 31 December 1919. In 1920 he was offered command of submarine depot vessel , but instead chose to resign and was put on the retired list on 2 October 1920.

Second World War
In 1939, at the outbreak of the Second World War, Stoker was recalled to service in the Royal Navy. He was given the rank of acting captain and was Chief of Staff to Rear-Admiral Richard Matthew King, commander at Belfast-based . In August 1940, Stoker was given command of HMS Minos, an onshore base at the Port of Lowestoft.

In July 1942, Stoker was assigned as a Public Relations Officer with the Admiralty Press Division. In April 1944, he was a staff officer with the Supreme Headquarters Allied Expeditionary Force but after the Normandy landings, he returned to his previous role in the Admiralty. Stoker again retired from the Navy with the rank of captain in late 1945.

Sporting career
Stoker was an avid sportsman who as a schoolboy was proficient at tennis and rugby. He volunteered to serve on RAN’s submarine after hearing a false rumour of sponsorship to play polo in Sydney, Australia. 

Competing under the name Hew Stoker, he entered the 1920 Wimbledon Championships, losing in the first round to former finalist and doubles champion Major Josiah George Ritchie. In the following year's Wimbledon Championship, Stoker reached the third round, beating L. Andrews in the first and Arthur Wallis Myers in the second, losing to eventual finalist Manuel Alonso Areizaga. The 1922 at Wimbledon, Stoker defeated Sydney Watts in the first round but lost to Cecil Tindell-Green in the second. Stoker again made the second round at the 1923 Wimbledon Championships, beating Alexander Blair and losing to H.A. Carless. Stocker made the second round in 1924, winning against Brian Helmore and losing to Sydney Montague Jacob. In 1925 Wimbledon Championships Stoker lost in the first round to John Pennycuick. Stoker's final entry to Wimbledon came in 1927, when he lost his first-round match against William Powell.

Stoker continued his involvement in sport; he served as president of the Royal Navy Lawn Tennis Association between 1953 and 1963. In 1962, at the age of 77, he became Croquet Singles Champion of Ireland.

Partial filmography

One Precious Year (1933) – Sir John Rome
Channel Crossing (1933) – Captain R.H. Kilbee
The Man Who Knew Too Much (1934) – Police Chief At Siege (uncredited)
Koenigsmark (1935) – (uncredited)
Brown on Resolution (1936) – Captain Holt
The First Offence (1936) – Dr. Penrose
Pot Luck (1936) – Davey
It's You I Want (1936) – Braille
Moonlight Sonata (1937) – Club Member (uncredited)
Non-Stop New York (1937) – Captain
Crackerjack (1938) – Supt. Benting
Full Speed Ahead (1940) – Sir Robert Barrymore
Brighton Rock (1947) – Registrar (uncredited)
Call of the Blood (1948) – Uncle Ben
Woman Hater (1948) – Old Boy (uncredited)
It's Hard to Be Good (1948) – Elderly Man (uncredited)
Call of the Blood (1949) – French doctor
The Inheritance (1950)
Four Days (1951) – Baxter
Where's Charley? (1952) – Wilkinson
Star in the Summer Night  an episode from Armchair Theatre (1959) – Martin McDonald

Family life and legacy
Stoker was married twice; his first wife was Olive Joan Violet Gwendoline Leacock, daughter of Colonel Schuler Leacock of the Bengal Cavalry. The marriage ended in divorce when Stoker, after returning to England after service with the RAN and being a POW in Turkey, discovered she had given birth to three children in his absence. In 1925, Stoker published an autobiography called "Straws in the Wind"; the same year, he married actor Dorothie Margaret Pidcock, to whom he  remained married until his death on his 81st birthday, 2 February 1966.

With the introduction of a separate Australian Honours system, there has been debate about whether Stoker should be awarded the Victoria Cross for Australia for his service as commander of AE2 during the Dardanelles campaign.

References

Further reading

External links
H.G. Stoker at allmovie

1885 births
1966 deaths
British male tennis players
Irish croquet players
Dublin hurlers
Irish male tennis players
Irish polo players
Irish sailors in the Royal Navy
Royal Navy submarine commanders
Royal Navy officers of World War II
Royal Navy officers of World War I
Sportspeople from Dublin (city)
Irish male stage actors
Irish male film actors
20th-century Irish male actors
Companions of the Distinguished Service Order
Graduates of the Royal Naval College, Greenwich